HIM The Video Collection is a DVD compilation by Finnish band HIM, released in 2003 which features most of the videos until the And Love Said No: The Greatest Hits 1997-2004 compilation.  This was the group's first DVD release.

Track listing
"Buried Alive By Love" 
"The Funeral of Hearts"
"The Sacrament"
"Pretending"
"In Joy and Sorrow"
"Heartache Every Moment"
"Right Here in My Arms"
"Join Me in Death"
"Poison Girl"
"Gone With the Sin"
"Wicked Game"
"When Love and Death Embrace"
The making of "Buried Alive By Love"
The making of "The Sacrament"
Interrogation Footage (Interviews)

HIM (Finnish band) albums
2003 video albums
Music video compilation albums
2003 compilation albums